Ambale  is a village in the southern state of Karnataka, India. It is located in the Yelandur taluk of Chamarajanagar district in Karnataka.

Demographics
As of 2001 India census, Ambale had a population of 5761 with 2880 males and 2881 females.

See also
 Chamarajanagar
 Districts of Karnataka

References

External links
 https://chamrajnagar.nic.in/en/

Villages in Chamarajanagar district